Flowers in the Pavement is the debut album by Australian hip hop group Bliss n Eso, which was released on 23 August 2004 via Obese Records.

"This Is for You" received airplay on Triple J's Home and Hosed program, which exclusively features Australian music. It was also played on NOVA FM. "This Is for You" and "Pigs in the Porn Trough" securing Bliss n Eso as the 'hip hop' category winners and 'artist of the year' nominees at the annual National Music Oz Awards in 2003 and 2004. "Hip Hop Blues" was produced by Suffa from Hilltop Hoods. The group toured in support of the album, across Australia including dates in Adelaide, Canberra, Melbourne, Hobart and Brisbane.

Track listing 
All songs written by Jonathon Notley and Max MacKinnon, except where noted
 "Evolution" (intro) – 2:45
 "Creepy" – 5:24
 "Rubbed the Lamp the Wrong Way" (J. Notley, M. MacKinnon, Millis, C. Anquetil, C. Lee-Joe) – 4:37
 "Vagina Ice" (J. Notley, M. MacKinnon, C. Anquetil, C. Lee-Joe) – 3:23
 "Clean the Tub" – 0:59
 "Pigs in the Porn Trough" (J. Notley, M. MacKinnon, C. Anquetil, C. Lee-Joe) – 6:34
 "I Love You But..." – 0:19
 "Tunnel of Love" – 4:52
 "Greenhouse" (J. Notley, M. MacKinnon, Millis, C. Anquetil, C. Lee-Joe) – 4:50
 "Supermarket Chick" – 0:44
 "Get Amongst It" (J. Notley, M. MacKinnon, C. Anquetil, C. Lee-Joe) – 5:19
 "This is for You" – 3:36
 "Headless Princess" (featuring Ethic) – 7:09
 "Hip Hop Blues" – 4:00
 "Twisted Road" (J. Notley, M. MacKinnon, T. Ejjamai) – 4:00
 "Weathermen" – 3:35
 "Watchdog Water Dragons" – 5:17

Reception 

Vaughan Healey of Cyclic Defrost felt that it is "a deceptively dense album: full of laddish appeal but balanced by peculiar turns, strong production values and a lyrical depth" with its tracks "structured around sophisticated metaphor and clever metre" and "it continues the Obese tradition of releasing idiosyncratic, upfront local hiphop."

References 

2004 debut albums
Bliss n Eso albums